is Fujifabric's 7th single. The singles title track was featured as the ending theme in the 2007 film Nightmare Detective.

Track listing

Chart positions

2007 singles
2007 songs
Japanese film songs